Jupiter's Darling is a 1955 American Eastman Color musical romance film released by MGM and directed by George Sidney filmed in CinemaScope. It starred Esther Williams as the Roman woman Amytis, Howard Keel as Hannibal, the Carthaginian military commander and George Sanders as Fabius Maximus, Amytis's fiancé. In the film, Amytis helps Hannibal swim the Tiber River to take a closer look at Rome's fortifications.

The film features many historical characters, including Roman generals Fabius Maximus and Scipio Africanus who appears briefly, in addition to Hannibal. Carthaginians Mago Barca and Maharbal also appear.

Jupiter's Darling was based on Robert E. Sherwood's anti-war comedy play The Road to Rome (1927).

The film was the last of three films Williams and Keel made together, the other two being Pagan Love Song (1950) and Texas Carnival (1951). He later said he felt it was the best picture they made together. The movie was a huge financial flop and the last movie Williams made at MGM.

Cast

Production
The film was based on a 1927 play Road to Rome. Film rights were bought by MGM. In May 1933 the studio announced they would make a movie from the play. In June the studio listed the project among their upcoming productions. Rights appear to have lapsed because, in April 1939, MGM announced they had purchased the property again as a vehicle for Myrna Loy and Clark Gable with Joseph L. Mankiewicz to produce. In May 1940 MGM announced the film would star Loy.

In January 1950, MGM announced that Charles Schnee had just completed a script for Clarence Brown to direct and that they hoped Kirk Douglas to star. However no film resulted.

In January 1954, MGM announced they would turn the play into a musical called Jupiter's Darling starring Esther Williams and Howard Keel. MGM said because of this casting, Jane Powell was to go into Athena which had been intended for Williams, Ava Gardner would replace Powell in Love Me or Leave Me, and Lana Turner would replace Gardner in My Most Intimate Friend.

In her memoirs, Williams said she had been on maternity leave for three months while pregnant with daughter Susan, and had assumed that she would get straight to work on the film Athena. She, along with writers Leo Pogostin and Chuck Walters created the premise for Athena while making Easy to Love, and Walters finished the script while Williams was on maternity leave. However, Athena had already begun shooting when Williams arrived back from leave, and the studio had changed the swimming sequences to dancing sequences and replaced Williams with Jane Powell. Williams was then assigned Jupiter's Darling.

Howard Keel later said the studio decided to change the title from Road to Rome so audiences did not think it was a "Road" picture. He suggested Hannibal's Darling which led to the title of Jupiter's Darling.

In February 1954, George Sanders was announced as co-star; it was said he agreed to do it because he had the chance to sing. Keel said that Sanders' singing numbers were cut out of the final film.

Marge and Gower Champion joined the cast; Howard Keel signed a new long-term contract with MGM in April. Williams says director George Sidney delayed filming three months so the Champions could make the movie (they were doing Three for the Show at Columbia), but she says the real reason was Sidney was having marital difficulties with his wife, Lillian Burns, and did not want to go home; she says this led to Sidney insisting on long shoot days and rehearsal.

Shooting
During shooting, Williams broke her left eardrum, which had already been broken in five other films. She was fitted with a prosthesis from latex that covered her nose and ears that prevented water from rushing in. As a result, she could barely hear, taste or smell while wearing it, and her diving had to be limited. Stunt woman Ginger Stanley was Williams' body double in some of the underwater scenes.

In one of the film's scenes, Amytis, while fleeing from Hannibal and his soldiers, rides a horse over the edges of a cliff on the Tiber River. Williams refused to do the scene, and when the studio refused to cut it, the director called in a platform diver that Williams knew, Al Lewin. The stunt took place one time; the studio got its shot, and Lewin broke his back.

Filming of a sequence in Catalina Island took place in February 1954. There was also filming at Silver Springs in Florida.

The sequence involving painted elephants was hugely expensive.

It was the only Esther Williams musical at MGM to lose money. Dorothy Kingsley, who wrote the script, later said she wanted to do a musical version of Road to Rome:
It was a satire and, in fact, we even had Hannibal's elephants painted pastel colors—orange and green. Dore [Schary, head of MGM] was always against it, I must say. He was worried about doing satire and I have to agree with him: there were some wonderful visual things in it, even an elephant dance, but the satire didn't work. We took it out to a preview and I was sitting behind people in the front rows who took it seriously. It wasn't until halfway through the picture that someone in front said, "Oh, it's a satire." That's the only flop I had, I think.
Editor Ralph Winters called the movie "a real dog. I was stuck on this turkey for six months  but the people who made the picture really were darling."

Release
The film's world premiere was held in Milwaukee, Wisconsin. The cast, including a 350-pound baby elephant named Jupiter's Darling, embarked on a tour of nine U.S. cities.

Critical reception
A 1955 New York Times review of the film claimed that "Esther Williams must be getting bored with water. She goes swimming only three times in M-G-M's "Jupiter's Darling," which came yesterday to the Music Hall, and two of these times are forced upon her. She dunks only once for fun. And that, we might note, is the most attractive and buoyant thing in the film. It comes when Miss Williams, cast rashly as the fiancée of Emperor Fabius Maximus of Rome, peels off her stola and tunic after a long hot day in town and goes swimming in the pool of her villa, which is fancier than any pool in Hollywood." It also stated that "Miss Williams had better get back in that water and start blowing bubbles again."

Variety called it "fairly entertaining though a hit and miss affair."

Keel said he felt his performance as Hannibal was his best at MGM.

Box office
Box office reception was poor - according to MGM records, it made $1,493,000 in the US and Canada and $1,027,000 elsewhere resulting in a loss of $2,232,000.

Williams was meant to follow the movie with Say It in French but the film was never made.

Notes

See also
 List of American films of 1955
 List of films set in ancient Rome

References

External links
 
 
 
 

1955 films
1955 musical comedy films
American musical comedy films
American romantic comedy films
American romantic fantasy films
American romantic musical films
Second Punic War films
American films based on plays
Films set in ancient Rome
Films directed by George Sidney
Films scored by David Rose
Metro-Goldwyn-Mayer films
American musical fantasy films
Swimming films
Cultural depictions of Hannibal
Cultural depictions of Scipio Africanus
1955 romantic comedy films
1950s romantic fantasy films
CinemaScope films
1950s English-language films
1950s American films